The 2018 Elmbridge Borough Council election took place on 3 May 2018 to elect members of Elmbridge Borough Council in England. This was on the same day as other local elections. The Conservatives gained four seats at the election, whilst losing one, taking them to exactly half the seats on the council. This meant that the council remained in no overall control.

Ward Results

Claygate

Cobham and Downside

Esher

Hersham Village

Hinchley Wood and Weston Green

Long Ditton

Molesey East

Molesey West

Oatlands and Burwood Park

Oxshott and Stoke D'Abernon

Thames Ditton

Walton Central

Walton North

Walton South

Weybridge Riverside

Weybridge St George's Hill

By-elections

References

2018 English local elections
2018
2010s in Surrey